Nā Uyana Aranya Senāsanaya (Sinhala: නා උයන ආරණ්‍ය සේනාසනය, meaning 'Ironwood Grove Forest Monastery') is a Buddhist forest monastery in Kurunegala, Sri Lanka, associated with the Sri Kalyani Yogasrama Samstha. It spreads over more than 5000 acres of forest on the 'Dummiya' mountain range and is residence to about 150 Buddhist monks. Na Uyana is so named because of the old Ceylon ironwood forest that forms part of the monastery.

History 

Ancient cave dwellings with Brāhmī inscriptions, as well as ruins of a small Stupa complex, have been found at Na Uyana which date back to 3rd century BCE. The new stupa of the monastery is built on the location of this complex. One inscription states that King Uttiya has donated his pleasure grove to the Sangha. As Uttiya was the successor to King Devanampiya Tissa, during whose reign Buddhism was introduced to Sri Lanka, the ancient monastery at Na Uyana seems to have been one of the first in the country established outside Anuradhapura.

The ancient monastery was rediscovered by Ven. Wigoda Bodhirakkhita Thera in 1954. Sayadaw U Nandavamsa and Sayadaw U Javana, senior Burmese disciples of Mahasi Sayadaw, visited the monastery in 1956.

Ven. Angulgamuwe Ariyananda Thera moved to Na Uyana in 1997 with a group of monks and started a revival that has made it the largest monastery in the Yogasrama Samstha. It is also one of the main international monasteries in Sri Lanka, with about 25 foreign monks. Ven. Nauyane Ariyadhamma Mahathera, the Spiritual Director of Sri Kalyani Yogasrama Samstha, also used to reside at Na Uyana.

Layout 

Na Uyana has 4 main sections: Pansiyagama (or Kurunegala), 'Mountain', Matale and Aandagala, each about 30 minutes of a walk apart from the other. Pansiyagama section is the ancient monastery within the ironwood forest and contains the uposatha hall, meditation hall, refectory, library and offices in addition to about 80 kutis (monks' residences). 'Mountain' is the newly developed area on the main hill of the monastery, which has about 80 kutis and the main meditation hall. This area is being reforested. Matale section, which has about 20 kutis and a smaller meditation hall, is situated among grassy hills with less forest cover. Aandagala is a remote, densely forested area in the monastery which is not in direct contact with others, and is reserved for the most austere dhutanga practitioners. There are 4 mud huts in this area, and the occupants must go on almsround to the nearby villages. Meals are provided separately for the first three sections, yet some monks prefer going for alms.

Meditation 

Na Uyana is one of the two principal meditation monasteries of the Yogasrama Samstha, along with Nissarana Vanaya. The main meditation method taught is 'Pa-Auk Samatha Vipassana', and the senior meditation teacher is Ven. Ariyananda Thera. It was possible to have interviews with Ven. Ariyadhamma Mahathera, while he was there and before he passed away. Practitioners may join the group sittings conducted in the two main meditation halls, or continue on their own in their kutis.

The Most Ven. Bhaddanta Āciṇṇa, the current Pa-Auk sayadaw, undertook a long-term personal retreat at Na Uyana Aranya in 2007, staying in seclusion and suspending his teaching schedule throughout the year.

Directions 
Take the road to Madahapola at the Melsiripura junction (between Kurunegala and Dambulla) on the A6 highway. At the Pansiyagama junction on the Madahapola road, take the road to Galewela. About 1 km on this road is the Na Uyana road, which leads to the monastery.

See also 
 Nauyane Ariyadhamma Mahathera
 Sri Kalyani Yogasrama Samstha
 Nissarana Vanaya

Notes

References

External links 
 Na Uyana Aranya Official Website
 Pa-Auk Forest Monastery - International Contacts

Buddhist monasteries in Sri Lanka
Buddhist temples in Kurunegala District
Theravada Buddhist monasteries
Pa-Auk Society